A maid of honour is a junior attendant of a queen in a royal household.

Maid of honour or Maid of honor may also refer to:

 a senior bridesmaid
 Maids of honour tart, traditional English dish
 The Maid of Honour, a Jacobean era stage play

See also

 Made of Honor, a 2008 film